Alessandro Guidiccioni may refer to:
Alessandro Guidiccioni (iuniore) (1557–1637), Italian Roman Catholic bishop
Alessandro Guidiccioni (seniore) (died 1605), Italian Roman Catholic bishop